Asep Kambali (July 16, 1980) from Cianjur is an Indonesian historian who is concerned with the field of Indonesia History of Colonial Era. Asep is known as a "traveling history teacher", an activist in preserving history and culture, also as a founder of Komunitas Historia Indonesia (Indonesia Historia Community). According to him, his and his community's goal is to remind younger generations in Indonesia to love their country through understanding of Indonesia's traces of history and culture.

Asep is known to be highly dedicated in his field. Asep stated in the past that "A great nation is the one that can appreciate its history. The reason why this nation is never great is because we refuse to appreciate history”

Asep also co-founded Paguyuban Asep Dunia (World Asep Community). A community of people named Asep.

Awards
 Indonesia Achievement Award (Indonesia Berprestasi Award) organized by XL Axiata, 2008.

References

External links
 Jakarta Globe: Asep Kambali on a Crusade to Make History Relevant
 The Jakarta Post: Photo Contest Attracts Visitors Museum Event
 Channel News Asia: Jakarta Governor Plans Revival of The Queen of The East
 Straits Times: Sukarno Film Reeling Controversy
 Asia News Network: Ruins of Majapahit Capital in Indonesia saved
 Jakarta Globe: Indonesia Reacts to 'Act of Killing' Academy Nomination
 Brilio: Faces of Jakarta Asep Kambali, President of Asep Community
  Metro TV, Kick Andy: Asep Kambali
  Kompas: Asep dan Propaganda Sejarah 
 The Jakarta Globe: My Jakarta, Asep Kambali
  Official website of Indonesia Historia Community

1980 births
21st-century Indonesian historians
People from Jakarta
Living people
Sundanese people